Kyaw Phyo Wai (born 21 June 1999) is a Burmese professional footballer who plays as defender for Yangon United.

Club career

Early year
From 2010 to 2017, Kyaw Phyo Wai studied at Mandalay Football Acedamy. Then, he played at Zwekapin United F.C.

Yangon United
In Jan 2021, Yangon United signed Kyaw Phyo Wai from Zwekapin United F.C.

References

1999 births
Living people
Yangon United F.C. players
Association football midfielders
Burmese footballers